Chantal Corbrejaud (born 25 July 1954) is a French sprinter. She competed in the women's 4 × 100 metres relay at the 1976 Summer Olympics.

References

External links
 

1954 births
Living people
Athletes (track and field) at the 1976 Summer Olympics
French female sprinters
Olympic athletes of France
Place of birth missing (living people)
Olympic female sprinters